Cyrtarachne sunjoymongai is a species of orb-weaver spider from the forests of the Western Ghats of Karnataka, India. It was first formally named in 2015, after naturalist and photographer Sunjoy Monga.

References
 

Araneidae
Spiders described in 2015